A design studio or drawing office is a workplace for designers and artisans engaged in conceiving, designing and developing new products or objects. Facilities in a design studio include clothes, furniture art equipment best suited for design work and extending to work benches, small machines, computer equipment, paint shops and large presentation boards.

Size
The size and conveniences also depends upon the type of the studio. Freelance designers engaged in product design often have a small set-up of their own, the smallest being within private residences. The ambiance of a design studio is often noted for its informality. The number of designers working in a typical design studio may vary widely, from a single individual to up to 1000 members. In such large studios, apart from designers, the staff may also consist of other technicians and artisans engaged in prototyping and engineering detailing, in addition to administrative staff and designers. They’re composed of flexible work spaces where design thinking thrives

Ownership
The smallest studios are operated by individuals, while the medium to bigger ones may be owned and operated by manufacturers involved in consumer goods or by design firms engaged in design services catering to different firms and industries. Such independent design studios may also function as design studios as well as design firms.

Types

Automotive design studios
Automotive design studios are usually large, where space is required for multiple cars under development, in addition to clay modeling surface tables, large scanners and clay milling machines. Such studios also have a presentation area to accommodate at least 20 to 30 people for presentations and design briefings with clients. Automobile manufacturer studios are often treated as a separate entity and housed within a compound. Most of these design studios are often located in a different part of the city or country and are isolated from the manufacturing and engineering environment. Such studios are often high security areas, where even internal access to most areas is severely restricted.

OKB
OKB is a transliteration of the Russian initials of "" – , meaning 'experimental design bureau'. During the Soviet era, OKBs were closed institutions working on design and prototyping of advanced technology, usually for military applications.

See also

 Studio

References

Design
Vehicle design
Automotive industry
Studios
Industrial design firms